Martin Redmayne, Baron Redmayne,  (16 November 1910 – 28 April 1983) was a British Conservative politician.

Redmayne was the second son of civil engineer and farmer, Leonard Redmayne and his wife Mildred and was educated at Radley College. He served in World War II, commanding the 14th Battalion of the Sherwood Foresters (Nottinghamshire and Derbyshire Regiment) in Italy in 1943 and the 66th Infantry Brigade from 1944 to 1945. He was awarded the DSO in February 1945, Mentioned in Despatches on 11 January 1945 and made an Honorary Brigadier in 1945.

In 1950, Redmayne entered the Commons as Conservative MP for Rushcliffe. He was a Government Whip a year later, a Lord Commissioner of the Treasury from 1953 to 1959, Deputy Chief Whip from 1955 to 1959 and Parliamentary Secretary to the Treasury and Government Chief Whip from 1959 to 1964. He was the Chief Whip during the Profumo affair. Admitted to the Privy Council in 1959, he was made a baronet on 29 December 1964 and after leaving the Commons, was created a life peer as Baron Redmayne, of Rushcliffe in the County of Nottinghamshire on 10 June 1966. Lord Redmayne died in 1983, aged 72. His baronetcy was inherited by his eldest son, Nicholas.

References

Sources
Burke's Peerage & Gentry

External links 

1910 births
1983 deaths
Politicians from Nottingham
Conservative Party (UK) MPs for English constituencies
Conservative Party (UK) life peers
Baronets in the Baronetage of the United Kingdom
Companions of the Distinguished Service Order
Members of the Privy Council of the United Kingdom
Sherwood Foresters officers
British Army personnel of World War II
UK MPs 1950–1951
UK MPs 1951–1955
UK MPs 1955–1959
UK MPs 1959–1964
UK MPs 1964–1966
UK MPs who were granted peerages
Life peers created by Elizabeth II
People educated at Radley College
Ministers in the third Churchill government, 1951–1955
Ministers in the Eden government, 1955–1957
Ministers in the Macmillan and Douglas-Home governments, 1957–1964